Bruno Oscar Klein (6 June 1858 — 22 June 1911) was an American composer and organist of German origin.  He wrote a number of works for orchestra, some chamber music, church music, and a large number of songs.

Life and career
Born in Osnabrück, Klein began his musical training in piano and composition with his father who made a living as an organist. He then studied at the Munich Conservatory (MC) from 1875-1878 where he was a pupil of Carl Baermann, Josef Rheinberger, and Franz Wüllner.

After graduating from the MC, Klein came to the United States in 1878 at the age of 20, He settled in New York City where he became involved with managing the German Theatre on Madison Ave during the early 1880s. He served as the head of the piano department at the Convent of the Sacred Heart from 1884 until his death 27 years later. In 1894-1895 he returned to Germany to perform as a concert soloist. His opera Kenilworth premiered in Hamburg in 1895. He was also the organist at the Church of Saint Francis Xavier for ten years and taught on the faculty at the National Conservatory of Music of America. He also taught music out of a private studio. Among his pupils was composer and organist Paul Ambrose.

Klein died in 1911 at his home on Madison Ave in Manhattan. He was 53 years old. His son, also Bruno Oscar Klein, was a violinist by profession.

References

External links
 

1858 births
1911 deaths
American male classical composers
American classical composers
American male organists
German emigrants to the United States
University of Music and Performing Arts Munich alumni
American opera composers
Male opera composers
Pupils of Josef Rheinberger
Musicians from Osnabrück
Musicians from New York City
Classical musicians from New York (state)
American organists